Zackrisson is a surname. Notable people with the surname include:

Emma Zackrisson (born 1979), Swedish golfer
Hampus Zackrisson (born 1994), Swedish footballer
Mia Boman (Maria, née Zackrisson) (born 1975), Swedish curler and coach
Patrik Zackrisson (born 1987), Swedish ice hockey player